General elections were due to be held in Lesotho in September 1985, the first since 1970, when the ruling Basotholand National Party carried out a coup d'état by declaring a state of emergency after annulling the election, which they had lost to the Basutoland Congress Party. However, the election was boycotted by all parties except for the BNP, which duly won all 60 seats by default.

References

Elections in Lesotho
General
One-party elections
Lesotho
Uncontested elections